4-EA-NBOMe is a substituted amphetamine and 25-NB derivative which has been sold as a designer drug. It was first identified by a forensic laboratory in Germany in 2014, but while its analytical properties and metabolism have been studied, its pharmacology remains unknown.

See also 
 25E-NBOMe
 4-Ethylamphetamine
 Benzphetamine
 Clobenzorex

References 

 
Substituted amphetamines